Wong Nai Chung Road (Chinese: 黃泥涌道) is a major road in Happy Valley, Hong Kong. It is a U-shaped road that encircles the southern and eastern sides of the Happy Valley Racecourse.

Location
Wong Nai Chung Road starts northeast at the junction with Leighton Road, then turns southward and meets Blue Pool Road at the southern residential area of the valley. It turns westward to Hong Kong Sanatorium & Hospital and then northwest to meet Morrison Hill Road and Queen's Road East and under the Wong Nai Chung Gap Flyover.

The western side of the road on the west of the valley forms part of the eastern limits of the City of Victoria.

Features
 Amigo restaurant (No. 79A)
 St Paul's Primary Catholic School (聖保祿天主教小學) (No. 81A). The school building was designed by Leigh & Orange and constructed in 1907 for the Roman Catholic Order of the Sisters of St Paul de Chartres. It is listed as a Grade II historic building since 1992.
 Two of the three infield entrances to the Happy Valley Race course, with one just past Sports Road near the Hong Kong Football Club and the other opposite the Happy Valley Tram Stop.

Transport
A circular branch line of Hong Kong Tramways runs along Wong Nai Chung Road, serving Happy Valley and the Happy Valley Racecourse. Its terminus is at the southernmost point of the road.

See also
 List of streets and roads in Hong Kong

References

Happy Valley, Hong Kong
Roads on Hong Kong Island